Cerean may refer to:
 an adjective pertaining to the goddess Ceres (also Cererian, Cererean)
 an adjective and demonym pertaining to the dwarf planet Ceres
 List of Star Wars species (A–E)#Cerean, a fictional species in the Star Wars universe

See also
 Cereal (disambiguation)
 Syrian (disambiguation) (a homophone)
 Kerian District